Uropeltis ruhunae is a species of snake in the family Uropeltidae. The species is endemic to Sri Lanka.

Etymology
The specific name, ruhunae, refers to the ancient Sri Lankan Kingdom of Ruhuna.

References

Further reading
Deraniyagala, P.E.P. (1954). "Two new snakes from Ceylon". Proceedings of the 10th Congress of the Ceylon Association for the  Advancement of Science 1: 24. (Uropeltis ruhunae, new species).

Uropeltidae
Reptiles of Sri Lanka
Endemic fauna of Sri Lanka
Reptiles described in 1954